This is a list of members of the South Australian Legislative Council from 1836 to 1843. Beginning with the arrival of John Hindmarsh on 28 December 1836, there were five members of the Council of Government, both Executive and Legislative, consisting of: the Governor, Judge, Colonial Secretary, Advocate-General, and Resident Commissioner until 4 December 1838. From the latter date until 20 February 1843, the officials were: the Governor and Resident Commissioner, Colonial Secretary, Advocate-General, Surveyor-General, and Assistant Commissioner of Lands.

 Stephen was Advocate-General & Crown Solicitor 9 February 1838 to 18 July 1838; acting Governor 16 July 1838 to 12 October 1838; and Colonial Secretary 5 December 1838 to July 1839
 Sturt was later Registrar-General 1839 and 1846–1847; Colonial Secretary 1849–1851

References

Members of South Australian parliaments by term
19th-century Australian politicians